James Christopher Reginald Smith (20 January 1912 – 6 January 2004), was an English footballer and manager, who played Outside left (the pre-modern day equivalent of left wing).

Playing career 
The son of a South African rugby union international, Smith began his career as an amateur with Hitchin Town in the early 1930s, playing in one of that club's finest teams and helping them to the Spartan League title in 1935, before turning professional when he joined Millwall later that year.

After a slow start at The Den, Smith came to terms with professional football in 1936–37, helping his new side to FA Cup semi-finals, the first time a team from the third tier of English football had reached that stage. In the 1937–38 season Smith enjoyed even greater success, as Millwall hurtled to the Division Three South title, while also claiming the London FA Challenge Cup by defeating Crystal Palace.

Smith became Millwall's last full England internationalist in 1938, when he was selected for two games in seven days in November, despite only playing in the English second tier at the time. He scored twice on his debut versus Norway in a 4–0 win, but didn't score in a 7–0 defeat of Northern Ireland.

When the Second World War broke out in 1939, Smith, like many other footballers, found his career disrupted. He joined the RAF and continued to appear sporadically for Millwall when his military schedule allowed. He was transferred to RAF Leuchars in Fife in 1944 and subsequently turned out for Dundee as a guest in the war-time North-Eastern League. When the hostilities finished, he joined the Dark Blues on a permanent deal in March 1946, helping them to the B Division title in 1946–47.

Managerial career 
In 1948, Smith was appointed player-manager of Corby Town upon the club's formation but left after only a couple of months for family reasons, returning north to Dundee where he became a coach. He moved into management with Dundee United in September 1954, leaving his coaching post at rivals Dundee to join United. After two seasons of steady mid-table finishes, he resigned to take over as manager of Falkirk (then bottom of Division One) in January 1957. Three months later, Smith had saved the Bairns from relegation and led his new club to victory in the Scottish Cup.

In the summer of 1959, Smith was approached by old club Millwall to replace Jimmy Seed as manager, and he returned to the Londoners for the beginning of the 1959–60 season. His side started well, setting a Millwall record 19 match unbeaten run. However, a high proportion of draws ensured they finished no higher than 5th, just missing out on promotion from Division Four. Despite challenging at the top of the table again the following season, Millwall sacked Smith in January 1961, replacing him with assistant Ron Gray. He then moved to South Africa to become manager of Addington, but returned to England later in the year when he was appointed manager of Bedford Town in November 1961. He resigned in September 1963, but was persuaded to stay on until December. He subsequently returned to Addington and then managed Cape Town Spurs before returning to Bedford in November 1971, remaining in post until June 1972. He was appointed assistant manager at Stevenage Athletic for the 1972–73 season, before going on to work at a computer company.

Honours

As a player 
Millwall
Division Three South champions: 1937–38

Dundee
B Division champions: 1946–47

As a manager 
Falkirk
 Scottish Cup winners: 1956–57

References

External links 
 

English footballers
England international footballers
England wartime international footballers
Hitchin Town F.C. players
Millwall F.C. players
Dundee F.C. players
English football managers
Corby Town F.C. managers
Dundee United F.C. managers
Falkirk F.C. managers
Millwall F.C. managers
Addington F.C. managers
Bedford Town F.C. managers
Cape Town Spurs F.C. managers
Footballers from Battersea
1912 births
2004 deaths
Scottish Football League managers
English people of South African descent
Royal Air Force personnel of World War II
Association football outside forwards